T. chinensis may refer to:
 Taxus chinensis, the Chinese yew, a conifer species
 Tricyrtis chinensis, a herbaceous plant species found in southeastern China
 Tsuga chinensis, the Taiwan or Chinese hemlock, a coniferous tree species native to China, Taiwan, Tibet and Vietnam
 Turbo chinensis, a sea snail species

See also 
 Chinensis (disambiguation)